Israil Madrimov is a professional boxer from Uzbekistan. As an amateur he won a silver medal in the welterweight division at the 2014 Asian Games and gold in the middleweight division at the 2018 edition.

Amateur career
At the international level, Madrimov won gold medals at the 2017 Asian Championships and 2018 Asian Games, and silver medals at the 2011 Junior World Championships; 2013 Asian Youth Championships; and 2014 Asian Games. At national level he won the 2013 and 2016 Uzbekistan National Championships, and placed second at the 2014 edition.

Results

AIBA World Championships
2017

Defeated Azizbek Achilov (Turkey) TKO 3
Lost to Troy Isley (United States) 2–3

Asian Games
2014

 Defeated Dipesh Lama (Nepal) TKO 2
Defeated Yasuhiro Suzuki (Japan) TKO 3
Defeated Apichet Saensit (Thailand) 3–0
Lost to Daniyar Yeleussinov (Kazakhstan) 0–3

2018

Defeated Davaasürengiin Davaanyam (Mongolia) 5–0
Defeated Shahin Mousavi (Iran) 5–0
Defeated Eumir Marcial (Philippines) 3–2
Defeated Abilkhan Amankul (Kazakhstan) 3–2

Asian Championships
2017

Defeated Qasim Abudabaat (Palestine) TKO 1
Defeated Eumir Marcial (Philippines) 5–0
Defeated Abilkhan Amankul (Kazakhstan) 5–0
Defeated Lee Dong-Jin (Korea) 4–1

Professional career

Madrimov vs. Hernandez 
Madrimov made his professional debut on 24 November 2018, against Vladimir Hernandez at the Hard Rock Live in Atlantic City, New Jersey, with the vacant WBA Inter-Continental super-welterweight title on the line. Madrimov dropped his opponent in round three en route to a sixth-round technical knockout (TKO) victory. At the time of the stoppage, Madrimov was ahead on all three judges' scorecards (50–44, 50–43, 49–45). The fight was part of the undercard for Dmitry Bivol's successful world title defence against Jean Pascal.

Madrimov vs. Rojas 
Madrimov made the first defence of his title, again on the undercard of a Dmitry Bivol world title fight – this time against Joe Smith Jr. – on 9 March 2019 against Frank Rojas at the Turning Stone Resort & Casino in Verona, New York. Madrimov dropped his opponent in round two with a left hook. Rojas rose to his feet before the referee's count of ten, only to be knocked unconscious moments later with another powerful left hook, giving Madrimov the win via second-round knockout (KO). Two days before the fight it was announced Madrimov's promoters, World of Boxing, had signed a co-promotional deal with Eddie Hearn's Matchroom Boxing USA.

Madrimov vs. Gonzalez 
Madrimov won via sixth-round TKO over Norberto Gonzalez in June.

Madrimov vs. Barrera 
Madrimov defended his title for a second time against Alejandro Barrera on 5 October 2019 at Madison Square Garden, New York City, on the undercard of the Gennady Golovkin vs. Sergiy Derevyanchenko world title fight. Madrimov retained his title with a fifth-round TKO.

Madrimov vs. Walker 
On 15 August 2020, Madrimov fought Eric Walker in the co-main event on a DAZN-televised card in Tulsa, Oklahoma. Madrimov won the fight by unanimous decision, however there was controversy because it appeared that Madrimov had knocked Walker down and out with a legal punch in the 9th round of the fight, but referee Gary Ritter ruled that it was not a knockdown or a knockout, but rather that Madrimov had illegally knocked Walker down with his shoulder. As Walker remained down on the canvas for a minute, telling Ritter that he was dizzy, Ritter implored the fighter to get back up. After a minute, Walker stood up, stumbled into the ropes and then collapsed into the corner. Ritter gave Walker 5 minutes to recover and then restarted the fight, allowing Walker to take further punishment for 2+ rounds. Hall of Fame referee Steve Smoger admonished Ritter after the fight for not ruling a knockdown and subsequent knockout and allowing Walker to take unnecessary punishment afterward. Garry Ritter was criticized by the public for not ruling the fight a knockout in the 9th round, and allowing Walker to take further punishment.

Madrimov vs. Soro I 
On 17 December, 2021, Madrimov fought Michel Soro, who was ranked #1 by the WBA at super welterweight, in an eliminator for the WBA super welterweight championship. Madrimov won by technical knockout in the 9th round.

Madrimov vs. Soro II 
The next bout was a rematch against Soro. A violent clash of heads in the third round cut Soro near the left eye and blood poured on the canvas. After consultation, referee Steve Gray decided to stop the bout and the bout ended in a technical draw.

Professional boxing record

References

External links 
Israil Madrimov - Profile, News Archive & Current Rankings at Box.Live

Living people
Year of birth missing (living people)
Date of birth missing (living people)
Uzbekistani male boxers
Light-middleweight boxers
Asian Games medalists in boxing
Asian Games gold medalists for Uzbekistan
Asian Games silver medalists for Uzbekistan
Medalists at the 2014 Asian Games
Boxers at the 2014 Asian Games
Medalists at the 2018 Asian Games
Boxers at the 2018 Asian Games